Bierre-lès-Semur (literally Bierre near Semur) is a former commune in the Côte-d'Or department in eastern France. On 1 January 2019, it was merged into the commune Le Val-Larrey.

Population

See also
Communes of the Côte-d'Or department

References

Former communes of Côte-d'Or
Côte-d'Or communes articles needing translation from French Wikipedia
Populated places disestablished in 2019